O